Petr Stanislav (born  in Kraslice) is a Czech male weightlifter, competing in the 69 kg category and representing Czech Republic at international competitions. He participated at the 1996 Summer Olympics in the 59 kg event. He competed at world championships, most recently at the 1998 World Weightlifting Championships.

Major results

References

External links
 

1973 births
Living people
Czech male weightlifters
Weightlifters at the 1996 Summer Olympics
Olympic weightlifters of the Czech Republic
People from Kraslice
Sportspeople from the Karlovy Vary Region